Acyl-CoA-binding protein in humans belongs to the family of Acyl-CoA-binding proteins.

This gene encodes diazepam binding inhibitor, a protein that is regulated by hormones and is involved in lipid metabolism and the displacement of beta-carbolines and benzodiazepines, which modulate signal transduction at type A gamma-aminobutyric acid receptors located in brain synapses. The protein is conserved from yeast to mammals, with the most highly conserved domain consisting of seven contiguous residues that constitute the hydrophobic binding site for medium- and long-chain acyl-Coenzyme A esters. Diazepam binding inhibitor also mediates the feedback regulation of pancreatic secretion and the postprandial release of cholecystokinin, in addition to its role as a mediator in corticotropin-dependent synthesis of steroids in the adrenal gland. 
Three pseudogenes located on chromosomes 6, 8 and 16 have been identified. Multiple transcript variants encoding different isoforms have also been described for this gene.

See also
 Diazepam

References

Further reading